Edward Harrington may refer to:
Edward Harrington (politician) (c. 1852–1902), Irish politician, Member of Parliament (MP) for West Kerry 1885–1892
Edward Harrington (poet) (1895–1966), Australian poet and short story writer
Edward F. Harrington (born 1933), U.S. federal judge
Edward F. Harrington (state representative) (1878–1951), member of the Massachusetts House of Representatives
Edward Harrington (born 1935), American blues musician better known as Eddy Clearwater
Ed Harrington (1941–2011), Canadian football player
Edward Harrington Jennings (1937–2019), president of University of Wyoming and The Ohio State University

See also
Edward Harington (disambiguation)